Anne le Helley (born 30 May 1981) is a French sailor. She competed at the 2004 Summer Olympics and the 2008 Summer Olympics.

References

External links
 

1981 births
Living people
French female sailors (sport)
Olympic sailors of France
Sailors at the 2004 Summer Olympics – Yngling
Sailors at the 2008 Summer Olympics – Yngling
Sportspeople from Saint-Brieuc
21st-century French women